Haberlandia hilaryae is a moth in the family Cossidae. It is found in southern Cameroon. The habitat consists of drier types of lowland tropical rainforests.

The wingspan is about 16 mm. The forewings are deep colonial buff with light brownish olive lines from the costal margin to the dorsum. The hindwings are deep colonial buff with a reticulated light brownish olive pattern.

Etymology
The species is named in honour of Hilary Sommerlatte.

References

Natural History Museum Lepidoptera generic names catalog

Endemic fauna of Cameroon
Moths described in 2011
Metarbelinae
Taxa named by Ingo Lehmann